Unia Tarnów, known as Grupa Azoty Unia Tarnów for sponsorship reasons, is a men's handball club from Tarnów, Poland, that plays in the Superliga. Between 1978-2010 the club was part of the Unia Tarnów sports club.

History
Historical names:
MKS MDK Tarnów (1960–1973)
MKS Pałac Młodzieży Tarnów (1973–1978)
ZKS Unia Tarnów (1978–2010)
SPR Tarnów (2010–2019)
Grupa Azoty SPR Tarnów (2019–2021)
Grupa Azoty Unia Tarnów (2021–)

Team

Current squad
Squad for the 2022–23 season

Goalkeepers
 16  Marek Bartosik
 21  Patryk Małecki

Left wingers
 23  Michał Słupski
 28  Jakub Sikora
Right wingers
 15  Keisuke Matsuura
 17  Aliaksandr Bushkou
Line players
 13  Shuichi Yoshida
 50  Korneliusz Małek
 74  Kenya Kasahara

Left backs
9  Paweł Podsiadło
 24  Aleksander Pinda
 35  Taras Minotskyi
Centre backs
5  Konrad Wątroba
8  Albert Sanek
 44  Ajdin Zahirović
 89  Jakub Kociuba
Right backs
 14  Jakub Kowalik
 19  Dzmitry Smolikau
 39  Przemysław Mrozowicz

Transfers
Transfers for the 2022–23 season

Joining
  Marek Bartosik (GK) (from  Zagłębie Lubin)
  Michał Słupski (LW) (from  SMS Kwidzyn)
  Paweł Podsiadło (LB) (from  Azoty Puławy)
  Dzmitry Smolikau (RB) (from  Stal Mielec)
  Kenya Kasahara (P) (from  Knattspyrnufélagið Hörður)

Leaving
  Casper Liljestrand (GK) (to  Górnik Zabrze)
  Łukasz Kużdeba (LW) (to  Energa MKS Kalisz)
  Wojciech Dadej (CB) (to  Chrobry Głogów)
  Kiryl Kniazeu (RB) (to ?)
  Mateusz Wojdan (RW) (to  Gwardia Opole)
  Mateusz Kaźmierczak (P) (to  Stal Mielec)

References

External links
 Official website 

Polish handball clubs
Sport in Lesser Poland Voivodeship
Handball clubs established in 1960
1960 establishments in Poland
Tarnów